Chan Man Fai (born 19 June 1988 in Hong Kong) is a former Hong Kong professional footballer.

Club career

Kitchee
In the 2011–12 Hong Kong Senior Challenge Shield first-round away match against Pegasus, Chan was sent off for handball, his second bookable offence. He missed the home match as a result.

Pegasus
Due to injury, Chan only played four matches for Pegasus, scored two goals and got two yellow cards.

South China
After the end of the 2014–15 season, Chan signed for South China. At the time of signing, he claimed that his relationships with the local players at South China were behind his reasoning to join. However, he struggled with injuries during his season there and left the club without making any appearances.

Southern
On 7 July 2017, Southern announced via their Facebook page that Chan had signed with the club due to his desire to work with head coach Cheng Siu Chung.

On 31 May 2019, it was announced that Chan would leave Southern after two seasons.

Tai Po
On 29 July 2019, Chan was unveiled as a Tai Po player.

International career
As a member of the Hong Kong national under-23 football team member, Chan took part in the 2010 Asian Games. He appeared as a substitute, took a pass from teammate Lam Hok Hei and scored the equalising goal for Hong Kong against United Arab Emirates in the 81st minute in the first group match. Afterwards, he claimed this was the most important goal of his career so far. United Arab Emirates did not concede another goal again until the final when they lost to Japan. He also scored against Bangladesh to give Hong Kong a 4:1 victory.

Honours
 Kitchee
 Hong Kong First Division: 2010–11

Career statistics

Club
As of 14 April 2007

International

Hong Kong
As of 19 November 2013

Hong Kong U-23
As of 1 February 2011

References

External links
Chan Man Fai at HKFA

1988 births
Living people
Hong Kong footballers
Association football midfielders
Association football forwards
Hong Kong First Division League players
Hong Kong Premier League players
Shek Kip Mei SA players
Kitchee SC players
TSW Pegasus FC players
South China AA players
Southern District FC players
Tai Po FC players
Hong Kong international footballers
Footballers at the 2006 Asian Games
Footballers at the 2010 Asian Games
Asian Games competitors for Hong Kong
Hong Kong League XI representative players